is a Japanese voice actress who works for Arts Vision.

Notable voice roles

Anime
1997
Yukari Kashima, Staff in Vampire Princess Miyu
Children in Cyber Marionette J
Battle Athletes

1998
Maki Rowel in Ginga Hyōryū Vifam
Girl Student in Nazca
Reika Yamamoto in Serial Experiments Lain
Fumiko Makuragi in St. Luminous Mission High School
Chibi, George in Bakusō Kyōdai Let's & Go!! MAX
Willy in Marvelous Melmo

1999
Mi in Cyborg Kuro-chan
Karen Jordan in AD Police
Misaki in Devil Lady
Yoshiharu in Let's Dance With Papa

2000
Kaga in Steel Angel Kurumi

2001
Kenta in X
Marimo Marino in Crush Gear Turbo
Johnny McGregor, Boy (D) in Beyblade
Mabel in Kirby: Right Back at Ya!
Lasagna, Hole in Groove Adventure Rave

2002
Eiko Yano, Receptionist in Witch Hunter Robin

2004
Kanako Kinoshita in Detective Conan

2005
Oosumi in Onmyou Taisenki

2006
Cellaria Markelight in Soul Link

2008
Mother Striker in Battle Spirits: Shounen Toppa Bashin

OVA
1993
Lovers Student (B) in Here Is Greenwood

1999
Jun Kamishiro in Melty Lancer

2001
Viola Gyunee in ZOE: 2167 IDOLO

Video games
1994
Jun Kubota in Advanced V.G.

1996
Orange in Fire Woman Matoi-gumi
Fairies (G) in Walküre no Densetsu Gaiden: Rosa no Bōken

1997
Akira Kazama in Rival Schools: United by Fate

1998
Jun Kubota in Advanced V.G. 2

2000
Annette in RPG Maker 2000 Sample Game
Akira Kazama in Project Justice

2001
Julia Douglas in Growlanser
Viola Gune in Zone of the Enders

2003
Viola A.I. in Anubis: Zone of the Enders

2006
Mai Misugi in Green Green 3 ~Hello, Good-bye~

Unknown date
Jun Kamishiro in Melty Lancer
Yuki Yamashiro in Kojin Kyouju: La Lecon Particuliere

Dubbing
Cordelia Chase in Buffy the Vampire Slayer and Angel

External links
 Official profile 
 

1974 births
Living people
Voice actresses from Tokyo
Japanese video game actresses
Japanese voice actresses
20th-century Japanese actresses
21st-century Japanese actresses
Arts Vision voice actors